Agrimonia is a heavy metal band from Sweden. Formed in 2005, the band released its self-titled demo in 2008 before releasing its first full-length, Host of the Winged, in 2010. Their second full-length album, Rites of Separation, was released in 2013. Major music websites such as Pitchfork have lauded the band's unique style and given it strong reviews, including an 8.0/10 for their second full-length album. The band is currently signed to Southern Lord Records, an American heavy metal label.

Members

Current
Christina Blom – vocals, keys (2005–present)
Magnus Andreasson – guitar (2005–present)
Pontus Redig – guitar, keys (2005–present)
Martin Larsson – bass (2010–present) (Skitsystem, At The Gates, House Of Usher, Macrodex, ex-Bombs Of Hades)
Björn Eriksson – drums (2005–present)

Past
Per Nilsson – bass (2005–2010)

Discography

Studio albums
Host of the Winged (2010) – Profane Existence
Rites of Separation (2013) – Southern Lord
Awaken (2018) - Southern Lord

Demos
Agrimonia (2008) – Self-released

References

Swedish crust and d-beat groups